The Northampton railway line ran from Geraldton through Northampton and on to Ajana in Western Australia. It operated between 1879 and 1957. It was the first government railway constructed in Western Australia.

Opening
Construction of the Geraldton railway station commenced in June 1878; the foundation stone was laid by Eliza, wife of Maitland Brown, on 21 August 1878, and it was completed in February 1879, the first railway station in the colony.

The line opened to Northampton on 26 July 1879. The line closed on 29 April 1957.

Locomotives
The line, as an isolated line, was constructed by two 2-6-0 Kitson locomotives. Originally classed as E1 and E2 they were later classified as M class.   They were constructed in 1875, and were in service on the line until 1893.  Also between 1879 and 1885 two Fairlie locomotives worked on the line

Northampton railway station
Northampton had two railway stations, the first (named Gwalla) lasted between 26 July 1879 until January 1884.  The second (named Mary Street) was opened in 1913 and closed when the railway closed in 1957.

Stopping places
 Geraldton
 Bluff Point (junction to Narngulu)
 Webberton
 Waggrakine
 Chapman
 Glenfield
 Wokarina (junction to Yuna)
 Sione Siding
 White Peak
 Oakajee
 Howatharra
 Webb's
 Taylor's
 Oakabella
 McGuire
 Iseeka
 Chally
 Ryans
 Bowes
 Northampton
 Baddera
 Ogilvie
 Hutt
 Binnu
 Ajana (terminus)

An interactive map of the line is available on OpenStreetMap.

In 2005 an old railway wagon was identified as being possibly the first item of rolling stock built for use on the line.

Closure 
On 29 April 1957 the line was closed, along with the associated Wokarina - Naraling - Yuna railway line at the same time.

See also
 Northern Railway (Western Australia)

Notes

Further reading
 Higham, Geoffrey (2006) Where was that? An Historical Gazetteer of Western Australia, Winthrop, W.A. Geoproject Solutions Pty Ltd.  

Closed railway lines in Western Australia
Northampton, Western Australia
Railway lines opened in 1879
Railway lines closed in 1957